The Calderonista Invasion of Costa Rica was a small rebellion carried out in North-West Costa Rica by forces loyal to the disgruntled former president Rafael Calderón, and was supported by the Government of Nicaragua who were unhappy with the election of Jose "Pepe" Figueres Ferrer to the Costa Rican Presidency two years prior.

Beginning
The rebellion started on 7 January 1955 when forces loyal to former president Rafael Calderón, who were backed by the Nicaraguan president Anastasio Somoza García, crossed the border from Nicaragua into Costa Rica. Venezuelan dictator Marcos Pérez Jiménez provided financial support to the rebels and, reportedly, air support. The rebel forces seized the border town of Villa Quesada on 12 January.

Jose Figueres accused the CIA of covertly aiding Nicaragua's invasion by sending pilots and sorties to covertly attack Costa Rica, notably subjecting at least 11 villages to machine gun fire.

Resolution
The Costa Rican government appealed to the Organization of American States to investigate. The Organization of American States found the Nicaraguan government was supporting the rebels and as soon as this was announced, the Nicaraguan government ended its support of the rebels. The United States sold Costa Rica four fighter planes, while the rebels were overwhelmed by the popularly backed government forces. After some fierce fighting in a handful of northern towns, the rebels were pushed out of Costa Rica.

References 

History of Costa Rica
Conflicts in 1955
1955 in Costa Rica
Wars involving Costa Rica
Civil wars involving the states and peoples of North America